John Chittick (born 29 October 1937) is an Australian hurdler. He competed in the 110 metres hurdles at the 1956 Summer Olympics and the 1960 Summer Olympics.

References

1937 births
Living people
Athletes (track and field) at the 1956 Summer Olympics
Athletes (track and field) at the 1960 Summer Olympics
Australian male hurdlers
Olympic athletes of Australia
People from Warrnambool